The Samsung Galaxy Young 2  is a low-end smartphone by Samsung Electronics which was released in June 2014. Like all other Samsung Galaxy smartphones, the Galaxy Young runs on the Android mobile operating system. It has a 3.5 inch TFT LCD touchscreen. The SM-G130H model is dual SIM capable. Many users have found the device's capabilities basic, seeing it as a low-end smartphone for children or teenagers who are having their first smartphone.

Specifications
The device runs on Android 4.4.2 KitKat with Samsung's TouchWiz Essence user interface. It has a 1 GHz, single core processor and 512 MB of RAM.

See also
Samsung Galaxy Fame

References

External links 

 

Samsung smartphones
Galaxy
Galaxy
Mobile phones introduced in 2014